Stereo Fuse is a post-grunge band from Dallas, Texas.

Stereo Fuse was formed in 2000 after guitarist Jeff Quay and drummer Chad Jenkins were forced to disband their previous group. The two left their former lead singer after a show in Atlanta in 2000, when the frontman told a particularly offensive joke and the band was asked to leave the stage.

Discovering singer-songwriter Colin Hill in Ft. Worth, the musicians formed Stereo Fuse and began writing and recording songs. In 2002, their cover of Material Issue's "Everything" became a most-requested song in the South and Midwest US, and went on to become a top-10 music video as well as entering the Billboard top 20 in 2003. The band toured with many well known acts, including Creed, Our Lady Peace, and Avril Lavigne.

Band members

Current line-up
 Colin Hill - vocals and acoustic guitar
 Jeff Quay - guitar
 Chad Jenkins - drums
 Rob Clark - bass guitar, background vocals
 Mark Slaughter - producer

Discography

Studio albums
2002: Stereo Fuse
2006: All That Remains

Singles
2002: "Superhero"
2002: "Everything" US Billboard Hot Adult Contemporary Tracks #23
2006" "Like I Do"
2006: “Beautiful”

External links
Stereofuse.com(Official website) 
[ Allmusic entry]

American post-grunge musical groups